Steven Aizlewood (9 October 1952 – 6 August 2013) was a Welsh professional footballer and a Wales Under-23 international defender.

Career

Aizlewood was born in Newport and began his career at his local team Newport County, signing a youth contract with the team in 1968. He went on to become a professional with the club the following season. He made his debut at the age of 16 years 194 days, making him the youngest ever Newport County player until his record was surpassed by Regan Poole in September 2014. Aizlewood appeared in nearly two hundred league games for Newport County. He was transferred to Swindon Town in 1976 for £13,500 and spent 4 years at the Wiltshire club until moving once more to Portsmouth in 1979 for £45,000. He captained the Portsmouth team that won the Third Division Championship in 1982–83.

His league career finished at Portsmouth in 1983, after which he played for two seasons for non-league club Waterlooville in the Southern League.

Aizlewood played five games for the Wales national under-23 football team. His brother Mark Aizlewood was also a Wales international footballer.

References

See also
Swindon Town player profile

1952 births
Newport County A.F.C. players
Footballers from Newport, Wales
Swindon Town F.C. players
Portsmouth F.C. players
Waterlooville F.C. players
Cheltenham Town F.C. players
Association football defenders
Welsh footballers
Wales under-23 international footballers
English Football League players
2013 deaths